GM Korea introduced the BU series bus in 1976 using the MAN diesel powered U engine platform.  Several platforms were built in this series.  In 1977, Saehan Motors took over the GM Korea bus operation.  The BU series continues to be made.

BU100 

GM Korea made the BU100 platform with 10 meter length version starting July 1976.  It was equipped with rear mounted MAN D0846HM-U diesel engine.  The marquee was renamed to Saehan (SMC) after it took over the bus division, but the series' name remained until January 1980.

BU110 

GM Korea reintroduced the express bus class of BU110 series a few years after they took over Shinjin Motors with the 11 meter bus length class.  Some of these buses were exported to Egypt.  The same engine platform is also used for the 10 meter counterpart.  The marquee was changed after Saehan Motors (SMC) took over.

BU120 

Saehan introduced BU120 with a stretched to 12 meter length sold for Seoul city transit as well as express bus services.  Due to the length of the chassis on city roads, it was not a commercial success for city transit area.  Only 183 buses were made before it was dropped.

Color scheme
The factory default color scheme was an all-white body with orange stripes.  Another scheme used was a green body  with alternating slant colors to white strip.  The city bus version is painted with horizontal color in white with main colour purple.

See also 
GM Korea Motor Company (1972~1976)

References 

 서울시내버스 도색역사 (Seoul Paint Scheme starting 1977)
 대우버스주식회사 회사소개: 기업연혁 G.M코리아 (Daewoo Bus Corporation's Company History: GM Korea)
Zyle Daewoo Bus Company: History 1970S/1980S (Picture marquee)
 자일대우버스(주) 회사소개: 연혁 1970~1980년대 (Zyle Daewoo Bus about us: History 1970 to 1980's) (Picture marquee)
 서울 버스 106 (Seoul bus route 160)
 BV113 시리즈 차종분석 (BV113 Series Car Analysis)

Buses by manufacturer
Buses of South Korea